"Lollipops and Roses" is a song composed by Tony Velona. The best-known version was a Grammy Award-winning recording by Jack Jones in 1962. The Jack Jones recording went to number twelve on the Easy Listening chart. The song was used for the end credits of episode 3 of season 2 of Mad Men.

Steve Lawrence version

Steve Lawrence covered the song for his album Winners!, released in January 1963. It was later released as a single in the Philippines, where it topped the national chart for seven straight weeks beginning in July 1965.

Other covers

Ray Rope's Small Grey Band
Perry Como (1962)
Paul Petersen (1962)
Clairette Clementino ("With All My Heart" b/w "Lollipops and Roses" [Colpix 797], 1964)
Doris Day (1964)
Trendsetters Limited ("Go Away" c/w "Lollipops and Roses" [Parlophone R5191], 1964)
Kate Smith (1964)
Vince Guaraldi Trio (1965)
Herb Alpert & the Tijuana Brass (1965)
Earl Grant (1968)
Walter Wanderley (1971)
Natalie Cole (2008)

References

External links
Small Grey Band

1962 songs
Grammy Award for Best Male Pop Vocal Performance
Herb Alpert songs
Jack Jones (singer) songs